The 39th World Cup season began in October 2004 in Sölden, Austria, and concluded in March 2005 at the World Cup finals in Lenzerheide, Switzerland. The overall winners were Bode Miller of the U.S. and Anja Pärson of Sweden.

The break in the schedule was for the 2005 World Championships, held in Bormio, Italy, between 28 January and 13 February 2005. The women's competition was held in the neighboring skiing area of Santa Caterina.

Calendar

Men

Ladies

Men 

At the World Cup finals in Lenzerheide only the best racers were allowed to compete and only the best 15 finishers were awarded with points.

Overall

Downhill 

In Men's Downhill World Cup 2004/05 the all results count.

Super G 

In Men's Super G World Cup 2004/05 all results count.

Giant Slalom 

In Men's Giant Slalom World Cup 2004/05 all results count.

Slalom 

In Men's Slalom World Cup 2004/05 all results count.

Super combined 

In Men's Combined World Cup 2004/05 only one competition was held.

Ladies 

At the World Cup finals in Lenzerheide only the best racers were allowed to compete and only the best 15 finishers were awarded with points.

Overall

Downhill 

In Women's Downhill World Cup 2004/05 all results count. Renate Götschl won her fourth Downhill World Cup.

Super G 

In Women's Super G World Cup 2004/05 all results count.

Giant Slalom 

In Women's Giant Slalom World Cup 2004/05 all results count.

Slalom 

In Women's Slalom World Cup 2004/05 all results count.

Women's Super combined 

In Women's Combined World Cup 2004/05 only one competition was held.

Footnotes

References

External links
FIS-ski.com - World Cup standings - 2005

2004–05
World Cup
World Cup